Ashuelot Pond is a  water body located in Sullivan County in western New Hampshire, United States, in the town of Washington.  It is situated along the upper reaches of the Ashuelot River, a tributary of the Connecticut River.

The pond is good for boating, fishing, and wildlife watching. Personal water craft with a capacity of two passengers or less are prohibited by the state of New Hampshire. The pond mostly has a muddy bottom.

The lake is classified as a warmwater fishery, with observed species including smallmouth bass, largemouth bass, chain pickerel, yellow perch, pumpkinseed, horned pout, and American eel.

Pond associations include the Ashuelot Pond Association and the LAE Association.

See also

List of lakes in New Hampshire

External links
Map of the pond

References 

Lakes of Sullivan County, New Hampshire
New Hampshire placenames of Native American origin